Dichen Lachman (born 22 February 1982) is a Nepali Australian actress and model. She earned recognition starring as Katya Kinski in the soap opera Neighbours (2005–2007) and as Sierra in Joss Whedon's science fiction drama series Dollhouse (2009–2010).

Lachman went on to portray Suren in the supernatural comedy-drama series Being Human (2012), Tani Tumrenjack in the military action-drama series Last Resort (2012–2013), Jiaying in the superhero drama series Agents of S.H.I.E.L.D. (2014–2020), Reileen Kawahara in the cyberpunk drama series Altered Carbon (2018–2020), Frankie in the crime drama series Animal Kingdom (2018–2021), and Ms. Casey in the thriller series Severance (2022–present).

Lachman has appeared in numerous films, such as Aquamarine (2006), Bled (2009), Lust for Love (2014), Too Late (2015), Bad Therapy (2020), Raya and the Last Dragon (2021), and Jurassic World Dominion (2022).

Early life
Lachman was born in Kathmandu, Nepal. She moved to Adelaide, Australia, in the early 1990s with her family.
Her mother is Nepali Tibetan, and her Australian father is of German descent. She attended West Lakes Primary School, Gilles Street Primary School, Norwood Morialta High School, St Mary's College, Adelaide, Annesley College and the University of Adelaide. She moved to Los Angeles shortly after she finished with the Australian TV drama Neighbours in 2007.

Career
Lachman first filmed an ad in Australia for Wanadoo, which aired in the United Kingdom. In 2005, she joined the cast of the Australian soap opera Neighbours as Katya Kinski. She had auditioned for the role of Elle Robinson, but the producers decided to create the part of Katya for her.

Lachman played a small role in the feature film Aquamarine. After she finished shooting the role of Aaren in the film Bled, Lachman joined the cast of the film Aztec Rex in Hawaii. In an interview with The Soap Show, Lachman said she had appeared on the BBC television show Ready Steady Cook while visiting England in late 2006. In the interview, she explained that she was in Los Angeles to advance her acting career, but said she would love to work in the UK and Australia.

On 26 March 2008, it was announced that Lachman would portray Sierra in the television series Dollhouse, created by Joss Whedon.

In an interview with ScifiNow in 2009, Lachman responded to the rumor that she would star in an upcoming television show based on Star Wars by saying, "I am a huge George Lucas fan. I love those movies and it would be a dream come true—I'd love to do it, it would be incredible." She was named one of the 100 hottest women on screen for 2009, by the lesbian media site AfterEllen.com. "What a privilege to be there," she said.

She guest starred as an insurance agent/street racer on NCIS: Los Angeles. She also appeared as Amy Hanamoa, the widow of a murdered police officer, in an episode of Hawaii Five-0. Lachman made a guest appearance in an episode of the Doctor Who spin-off Torchwood, for its fourth series Torchwood: Miracle Day. Additionally, in 2011 it was announced in Variety that Lachman would be joining the cast of Being Human as a series regular. Lachman also made a brief appearance in the web-series The Guild during Season 5, episode 8 as a party guest during a gaming convention.

In 2012, it was announced Lachman would be joining the Shawn Ryan–driven pilot Last Resort for ABC, and she subsequently appeared as a main character during the show's 13-episode run. She also guest starred in the second season of the Jane Espenson scripted web series, Husbands.

Between 2010 and 2013, while working on other productions, Lachman and her close friend Anton King produced Lust for Love. King wrote the script in 2010 and used Kickstarter to raise funds to make the movie. The initial goal was to raise US$70,000; however, when the deadline was reached on 11 November 2011 more than 1,500 people had pledged money, with a final figure of US$101,030. To complete the movie, additional funds were raised through friends and family. British filmmaker Jack Wylson came on board as a producer, Australian actor Adam J. Yeend as co-producer, and Adam Bricker as director of photography. Alessandro Ongaro of Luna Pictures Entertainment also made major contributions during post production.

In 2014, Lachman began shooting in Canada, where she joined the cast of The 100 in the role of Anya and had a recurring role on ABC's Agents of S.H.I.E.L.D.

On 11 June 2015, a new movie called Too Late, starring Lachman, was released during the Los Angeles Film Festival. On 22 October 2015, it was announced that Lachman landed a recurring role on the third season of Michael Bay's action-adventure TNT series The Last Ship. Lachman had been cast as Jesse, a helicopter pilot who lives off-the-grid. She starred as Reileen Kawahara in Netflix's original television series, Altered Carbon, an adaptation of the 2002 novel of the same name by Richard K. Morgan. The first season was released on 2 February 2018. Also, starting in 2018, Lachman began a recurring role as Frankie on Animal Kingdom during its third season.

In 2020, she returned for small story arcs on Agents of S.H.I.E.L.D. and Altered Carbon, and she also appeared in the film Bad Therapy. In 2022, Lachman joined the main cast of Severance, which premiered on Apple TV+. She appeared as Ms. Casey, a wellness counselor. The series received acclaim from critics and audiences, with Lachman being nominated for Best Supporting Actress in a Streaming Series, Drama at the 2nd Hollywood Critics Association TV Awards. Soon after she appeared as antagonist Soyona Santos in the film Jurassic World Dominion. Lachman was then announced as the titular character in Steven Brand's noir thriller Joe Baby.

Personal life
She has been married to Austrian-born American actor Maximilian Osinski since January 2015, and gave birth to their daughter that May.

Filmography

Film

Television

Web

Awards and nominations

References

External links

 

Living people
21st-century Australian actresses
Actors from Kathmandu
Actresses from Adelaide
Australian actresses of Asian descent
Australian expatriate actresses in the United States
Australian film actresses
Australian television actresses
Australian voice actresses
Australian people of Tibetan descent
Australian people of German descent
Australian soap opera actresses
Nepalese emigrants to Australia
University of Adelaide alumni
1982 births